Ronald James Gillespie,  (August 21, 1924 – February 26, 2021) was a British chemist specializing in the field of molecular geometry, who arrived in Canada after accepting an offer that included his own laboratory with new equipment, which post-World War II Britain could not provide. He was responsible for establishing inorganic chemistry education in Canada.

He was educated at the University of London obtaining a B.Sc. in 1945, a Ph.D. in 1949 and a D.Sc. in 1957. He was assistant lecturer and then lecturer in the Department of Chemistry at University College London in England from 1950 to 1958.

He moved to McMaster University, Hamilton, Ontario, Canada in 1958, passing away on February 26, 2021 at the age of ninety-six years in the nearby town of Dundas, Ontario. He was elected as a Fellow of the Royal Society of Canada in 1965, a Fellow of the Royal Society of London in 1977, and made a member of the Order of Canada in 2007.

Gillespie did extensive work on expanding the idea of the Valence Shell Electron Pair Repulsion (VSEPR) model of Molecular Geometry, which he developed with Ronald Nyholm (and thus is also known as the Gillespie-Nyholm theory), and setting the rules for assigning numbers. He has written several books on this VSEPR topic in chemistry. With other workers he developed LCP theory, (ligand close packing theory), which for some molecules allows geometry to be predicted on the basis of ligand-ligand repulsions. Gillespie has also done extensive work on interpreting the covalent radius of fluorine. The covalent radius of most atoms is found by taking half the length of a single bond between two similar atoms in a neutral molecule. Calculating the covalent radius for fluorine is more difficult because of its high electronegativity compared to its small atomic radius size. Gillespie's work on the bond length of fluorine focuses on theoretically determining the covalent radius of fluorine by examining its covalent radius when it is attached to several different atoms.

Publications
 Chemical Bonding and Molecular Geometry: From Lewis to Electron Densities (Topics in Inorganic Chemistry) by Ronald J. Gillespie and Paul L. A. Popelier
 Atoms, Molecules and Reactions: An Introduction to Chemistry by Ronald J. Gillespie
 Chemistry by Ronald J. Gillespie, David Humphreys, Colin Baird, and E. A. Robinson
 ''Atoms, Molecules and Reactions: An Introduction to Chemistry with D.A. Humphreys, E.A. Robinson and D.R. Eaton, Prentice Hall, 1994

References

1924 births
2021 deaths
British chemists
Inorganic chemists
Members of the Order of Canada
Academic staff of McMaster University
Alumni of the University of London
Academics of University College London
Fellows of the Royal Society of Canada
Fellows of the Royal Society
British emigrants to Canada